Air: Above and Beyond is a live album performed by multi-instrumentalist Joe McPhee's Trio X recorded in Canada in 2006 and first released on the CIMP label.

Reception
All About Jazz said "it's memorable set" and "For those who are used to the tenor-bass-drums setup as something frequently given to full-bore blowing, Trio X eloquently captures the tension before the release".

Track listing 
All compositions by Joe McPhee, Dominic Duval and Jay Rosen except as indicated
 "Fried Grapefruit" - 16:30
 "Jump Spring" - 10:57
 "2128½ Indiana" - 8:15
 "Close Up" - 7:31
 "Give Us This Day" - 10:22
 "Here's That Rainy Day" (Jimmy Van Heusen, Johnny Burke) - 5:41
 "A Valentine in the Fog of War" - 8:27

Personnel 
Joe McPhee - tenor saxophone
Dominic Duval - bass
Jay Rosen - drums

References 

Trio X live albums
2007 live albums
CIMP live albums